Lamotte Township is a civil township of Sanilac County in the U.S. state of Michigan. The population was 981 at the 2000 census.

Communities
The village was named after the Decker family who were prominent in the region. The family also gave their name to the named village of Deckerville, which is also located in Sanilac County, about 15 miles to the east.

Geography

Demographics
At the 2000 census there were 981 people, 356 households, and 274 families in the township. There were 384 housing units at an average density of 10.8 per square mile (4.2/km2). The racial makeup of the township was 98.06% White, 0.61% from other races, and 1.33% from two or more races. Hispanic or Latino of any race were 2.04%.

Of the 356 households, 36.8% had children under the age of 18 living with them, 66.0% were married couples living together, 7.3% had a female householder with no husband present, and 23.0% were non-families. 19.4% of households were one person, and 7.9% were one person aged 65 or older.  The average household size was 2.75 and the average family size was 3.16.

In the township the population was spread out, with 28.0% under the age of 18, 7.6% from 18 to 24, 28.8% from 25 to 44, 20.9% from 45 to 64, and 14.6% 65 or older.  The median age was 36 years. For every 100 females, there were 101.0 males.  For every 100 females age 18 and over, there were 102.3 males.

The median household income was $42,614 and the median family income was $46,563. Males had a median income of $33,333 versus $21,944 for females. The per capita income for the township was $18,651.  About 8.8% of families and 9.0% of the population were below the poverty line, including 11.5% of those under age 18 and 12.8% of those age 65 or over.

Notes

Townships in Sanilac County, Michigan
Townships in Michigan